The 2018 Scottish Open was a badminton tournament that took place at the Emirates Arena in Scotland from 21 to 25 November 2018 and had a total prize of $75,000.

Tournament
The 2018 Scottish Open was the eleventh Super 100 tournament of the 2018 BWF World Tour and also part of the Scottish Open championships, which had been held since 1907. This was the last tournament to be counted for the 2018 BWF World Tour Finals. This tournament was organized by BadmintonScotland and sanctioned by the BWF.

Venue
This international tournament was held at the Emirates Arena in Glasgow, Scotland.

Point distribution
Below is the point distribution table for each phase of the tournament based on the BWF points system for the BWF Tour Super 100 event.

Prize money
The total prize money for this tournament was  US$75,000. Distribution of prize money was in accordance with BWF regulations.

Men's singles

Seeds

 Rasmus Gemke (withdrew)
 Brice Leverdez (third round)
 Mark Caljouw (semi-finals)
 Rajiv Ouseph (semi-finals)
 Lucas Corvée (quarter-finals)
 Toby Penty (third round)
 Pablo Abián (second round)
 Victor Svendsen (quarter-finals)

Wild card
BadmintonScotland awarded a wild card entry to Matthew Carder of Scotland.

Finals

Top half

Section 1

Section 2

Bottom half

Section 3

Section 4

Women's singles

Seeds

 Cai Yanyan (semi-finals)
 Line Kjærsfeldt (final)
 Kirsty Gilmour (champion)
 Chen Xiaoxin (semi-finals)
 Beatriz Corrales (withdrew)
 Rachel Honderich (second round)
 Linda Zetchiri (withdrew)
 Yvonne Li (first round)

Finals

Top half

Section 1

Section 2

Bottom half

Section 3

Section 4

Men's doubles

Seeds

 Marcus Ellis / Chris Langridge (champions)
 Jelle Maas / Robin Tabeling (first round)
 Mark Lamsfuß / Marvin Emil Seidel (semi-finals)
 Jason Ho-shue / Nyl Yakura (first round)
 Jones Ralfy Jansen / Josche Zurwonne (withdrew)
 Jacco Arends / Ruben Jille (quarter-finals)
 Ben Lane / Sean Vendy (semi-finals)
 David Daugaard / Frederik Søgaard (final)

Finals

Top half

Section 1

Section 2

Bottom half

Section 3

Section 4

Women's doubles

Seeds

 Gabriela Stoeva / Stefani Stoeva (champions)
 Selena Piek / Cheryl Seinen (semi-finals)
 Émilie Lefel / Anne Tran (final)
 Delphine Delrue / Léa Palermo (semi-finals)
 Johanna Goliszewski / Lara Käpplein (quarter-finals)
 Rachel Honderich / Kristen Tsai (quarter-finals)
 Chloe Birch / Lauren Smith (quarter-finals)
 Emma Karlsson / Johanna Magnusson (quarter-finals)

Finals

Top half

Section 1

Section 2

Bottom half

Section 3

Section 4

Mixed doubles

Seeds

 Marcus Ellis / Lauren Smith (champions)
 Mark Lamsfuß / Isabel Herttrich (semi-finals)
 Jacco Arends / Selena Piek (final)
 Marvin Emil Seidel / Linda Efler (second round)
 Ben Lane / Jessica Pugh (second round)
 Ronan Labar / Audrey Mittelheisser (quarter-finals)
 Robin Tabeling / Cheryl Seinen (quarter-finals)
 Mikkel Mikkelsen / Mai Surrow (quarter-finals)

Finals

Top half

Section 1

Section 2

Bottom half

Section 3

Section 4

References

External links
 Tournament Link

Scottish Open (badminton)
Scottish Open
Scottish Open
Scottish Open